Bisraaga is a village in the Bingo Department of Boulkiemdé Province in central western Burkina Faso. It has a population of 438.

References

Populated places in Boulkiemdé Province